Whiteheadiana is a genus of beetles in the family Carabidae, containing the following species:

 Whiteheadiana latidens (Putzeys, 1861)
 Whiteheadiana longicollis (Putzeys, 1861)
 Whiteheadiana minor (Putzeys, 1866)
 Whiteheadiana stenocephala (Brulle, 1837)

References

Scaritinae